Ormetica pseudoguapisa is a moth of the family Erebidae. It was described by Walter Rothschild in 1910. It is found in Venezuela.

References

Ormetica
Moths described in 1910